Wojciech Kaczmarek (born 29 March 1983 in Gostyń) is a Polish retired football goalkeeper.

In March 2011 Kaczmarek was called up to Poland, for games against Lithuania and Greece, but did not appear in any of these games.

Honours
Zawisza Bydgoszcz
 Polish Cup: 2013–14

References

External links
 
 Wojciech Kaczmarek at Footballdatabase

1983 births
Living people
People from Gostyń
Sportspeople from Greater Poland Voivodeship
Polish footballers
Association football goalkeepers
Śląsk Wrocław players
MKS Cracovia (football) players
Zawisza Bydgoszcz players
Podbeskidzie Bielsko-Biała players
Ekstraklasa players